Rico Kühne (born 19 February 1982, in Dresden) is a German former footballer. Kuhne was a midfielder and played for FV Dresden-Nord, Dynamo Dresden, Rot-Weiss Erfurt and SC Borea Dresden.

References

External links

1982 births
Living people
Dynamo Dresden players
Dynamo Dresden II players
FC Rot-Weiß Erfurt players
Association football midfielders
German footballers
Footballers from Dresden